Tha Khantho is the northwesternmost district (amphoe) of Kalasin province, northeastern Thailand.

Geography
Neighboring districts are (from the south clockwise): Nong Kung Si of Kalasin Province; Kranuan of Khon Kaen province; Kumphawapi, Si That, and  Wang Sam Mo of Udon Thani province.

History
The minor district (king amphoe) Tha Khantho was established on 1 October 1962, when the two tambons Tha Khantho and Khok Khruea were split off from Sahatsakhan district. It was upgraded to a full district on 2 October 1965. Khok Khruea was later reassigned to Nong Kung Si District.

Administration
The district is divided into six sub-districts (tambons), which are further subdivided into 59 villages (mubans). Tha Khantho is a township (thesaban tambon) which covers tambon Tha Khantho and parts of Na Tan. There are a further six tambon administrative organizations (TAO).

Tha Khantho